Kazanka is a rural locality (a selo) in Inzersky Selsoviet, Arkhangelsky District, Bashkortostan, Russia. The population was 323 as of 2010. There are 4 streets.

Geography 
Kazanka is located 15 km north of Arkhangelskoye (the district's administrative centre) by road. Alexeyevskoye is the nearest rural locality.

References 

Rural localities in Arkhangelsky District